Simo Rantalainen (born August 6, 1961) is a Finnish former journalist and television presenter. He is best known for presenting the popular 1990s talkshow Hyvät, pahat ja rumat on MTV3.

In the early 1990's Rantalainen became a boxing promoter for Tarmo Uusivirta, Rantalainen wrote a memoir about his experience in February 2017.

Rantalainen lost his television hosting job after assaulting a female journalist in a nightclub

Since leaving showbusiness Simo Rantalainen converted to Islam and adopted the name Mujahed Bin Risto Faisal.

Further reading
Rantalainen, Simo (2017). Tare: mestarinyrkkeilijän muotokuva (in Finnish). Johnny Kniga. .

References

External Links 

1961 births
Living people
Finnish journalists
Finnish television presenters
People from Lahti
Finnish Muslims
Converts to Islam from Christianity
Boxing promoters